The 1998 World Field Archery Championships were held in Obergurgl, Austria.

Medal summary (Men's individual)

Medal summary (Women's individual)

Medal summary (Men's Team)

Medal summary (Women's Team)

References

E
1998 in Austrian sport
International archery competitions hosted by Austria
World Field Archery Championships